Woodlands Secondary School may refer to:

Woodlands Secondary School, Luton, Bedfordshire, England, UK
Woodlands Secondary School (Pietermaritzburg), KwaZulu-Natal, South Africa
The Woodlands School (Mississauga), Ontario, Canada
Woodlands Secondary School (closed), in School District 68 Nanaimo-Ladysmith, Vancouver Island, British Columbia, Canada
Woodlands Secondary School, Woodlands, Singapore